Debu may refer to:

People
 Debu Bhattacherjee (1934–1994), Bangladeshi painter and musician
 Debu Bose, Indian actor
 Debu Chaudhuri, Indian sitarist
 Debu Deodhar, Indian cinematographer
 Debu Majumdar (born 1976), Indian cricket player
 Debu Mitra (born 1948), Indian cricket player

Places

Other
 Debu (group)